The 1970–71 Cincinnati Royals season was the 23rd season of the franchise in the National Basketball Association (NBA). After trading Oscar Robertson, the Royals became a quick, young team. Some players included Norm Van Lier, a second-year guard who would lead the league in assists with 10.1 assists per game. Draft picks Sam Lacey and Nate "Tiny" Archibald were new additions to the team. The Royals would continue its fast-breaking, high-scoring ways. During the season, they were held below 100 points only four times all season. The Royals also broke the 130 point mark an astounding 11 times. The team's 116.0 scoring average was good for 3rd place in the NBA. Bob Cousy, the Royals coach was not defensive minded, and opposing teams racked up an average of 119.2 points per game. The Royals finished the season in 3rd place in the newly formed Central Division. The Royals would finish the season with a record of 33 wins, compared to 49 losses.

Draft picks

Roster

Regular season

Season standings

Record vs. opponents

Season Schedule

Awards and honors
 Norm Van Lier, NBA All-Defensive Second Team

References

 Royals on Basketball Reference

Cincinnati
Sacramento Kings seasons
Cincinnati
Cincinnati